Matthew Bennett is professor of environmental and geographical sciences at Bournemouth University. He is a specialist in ancient footprints and has developed the Fossil Footprint Archive jointly with Robin Crompton of the University of Liverpool.

Selected publications
     Doyle, P., Bennett, M.R. and Baxter, A.N., 1994. The key to earth history (first edition). John Wiley & Sons Inc.
     Bennett, M.M. and Glasser, N.F., 1996. Glacial Geology (first edition). Wiley.
     Bennett, M.R., 1996. The Quaternary of the Caimgorms: Field Guide. Quaternary Research Association, Cambridge.
     Bennett, M.R., 1996. Geology on Your Doorstep. Geological Society Publishing House.
     Bennett, M.R. and Doyle, P., 1997. Environmental geology. Wiley.
     Bennett, M.R. and Doyle, P., 1998. Issues in Environmental Geology. Geological Society Publishing House.
     Doyle, P. and Bennett, M.R., 1998. Unlocking the stratigraphical record. John Wiley & Son Ltd.
     Doyle, P., Bennett, M.R. and Baxter, A.N., 2001. The key to earth history. John Wiley & Sons Inc.
     Fields of Battle: Terrain in Military History. London: Kluwer Academic.
     Bennett, M.R., 2007. Geology of Snowdonia. Marlborough, Wiltshire: The Crowood Press Ltd.
     Bennett, M.R. and Glasser, N.F., 2009. Glacial Geology: Ice Sheets & Landforms. Chichester, England: Wiley-Blackwell.
 Bennett, M.R. and Morse, S.A., 2014. Human footprints: Fossilised locomotion?

References

External links 

Living people
Academics of Bournemouth University
British geographers
British geologists
Year of birth missing (living people)